Lophoceps quinquepuncta is a moth of the family Sesiidae. It is known from Sierra Leone.

References

Sesiidae
Moths of Africa
Moths described in 1919